Ethamoxytriphetol (developmental code name MER-25) is a synthetic nonsteroidal antiestrogen that was studied clinically in the late 1950s and early 1960s but was never marketed. MER-25 was first reported in 1958, and was the first antiestrogen to be discovered. It has been described as "essentially devoid of estrogenic activity" and as having "very low estrogenic activity in all species tested". However, some estrogenic effects in the uterus have been observed, so it is not a pure antiestrogen (that is, a silent antagonist of the estrogen receptor (ER)) but is, instead, technically a selective estrogen receptor modulator (SERM). For all intents and purposes, it is a nearly pure antiestrogen, however.

MER-25 produces antifertility effects in animals, and garnered interest as a potential hormonal contraceptive. However, clinical development was discontinued due to its low potency and the incidence of unacceptable central nervous system side effects, including hallucinations and psychotic episodes, with higher doses. Undesirable gastrointestinal side effects were also described. Prior to being discontinued, the drug was also administered by Roy Hertz to three patients with metastatic breast cancer and was found to provide relief from bone pain, presumably due to dissolution of bone metastases. This was the first such study of its kind of antiestrogen therapy for the treatment of breast cancer, and it led to the development of tamoxifen for this indication a decade later. The drug was also evaluated for the purpose of ovulation induction and as a treatment of chronic mastitis and endometrial cancer before clinical development was stopped.

MER-25, a simple triphenylethanol derivative, is closely related structurally to the triphenylethylene (TPE) group of SERMs, which includes clomifene and tamoxifen. The drug, a derivative of the cholesterol-lowering agent triparanol (MER-29) (which itself was derived from the estrogen chlorotrianisene (also known as TACE)), was originally being studied in animals at Merrell Dow as a treatment for coronary artery disease. Its antiestrogenic properties were discovered serendipitously when Leonard Lerner, a research endocrinologist at the company who was employed to study nonsteroidal estrogen pharmacology, noted the structural similarity of MER-25 to estrogenic TPE derivatives and decided to test the compound for estrogenicity. Instead of the expected estrogenic effects however, Lerner found that MER-25 blocked the effects of estrogens. Lerner subsequently went on to be involved in the discovery of clomifene, the first potently antiestrogenic TPE derivative to be characterized. The structure of clomifene is similar to that of its predecessor, MER-25. Clomifene is about 10-fold more potent as an antiestrogen than MER-25.

The affinity of ethamoxytriphetol for the rat ER is approximately 0.06% relative to estradiol. For comparison, the affinities of tamoxifen and afimoxifene (4-hydroxytamoxifen) for the rat ER relative to estradiol were 1% and 252%, respectively.

See also
 Fulvestrant
 Estrobin
 ICI-164384
 Broparestrol
 Raloxifene
 Nafoxidine
 Diethylstilbestrol
 Stilbestrol

References

Abandoned drugs
Tertiary alcohols
Diethylamino compounds
Antiestrogens
Hormonal antineoplastic drugs
Selective estrogen receptor modulators
Phenol ethers